Lillis is an unincorporated community in Marshall County, Kansas, United States.

History
Lillis was named for Rev. T. F. Lillis. A post office was opened in Lillis in 1910, and remained in operation until it was discontinued in 1958.

The Lillis Gymnasium is on the National Register of Historic Places.

References

Further reading

External links
 Marshall County maps: Current, Historic, KDOT

Unincorporated communities in Marshall County, Kansas
Unincorporated communities in Kansas